Paecilomyces hepiali is an entomophagous fungus. Based on 18S rDNA sequencing, this species is distinct from Ophiocordyceps sinensis. Samsoniella hepiali is defined by NCBI as a homotypic synonym of P. hepiali. Further work on the classification of this species was described in 2020.

References

Trichocomaceae